BRENDA (The Comprehensive Enzyme Information System) is an information system representing one of the most comprehensive enzyme repositories. It is an electronic resource that comprises molecular and biochemical information on enzymes that have been classified by the IUBMB. Every classified enzyme is characterized with respect to its catalyzed biochemical reaction. Kinetic properties of the corresponding reactants (that is, substrates and products) are described in detail. BRENDA contains enzyme-specific data manually extracted from primary scientific literature and additional data derived from automatic information retrieval methods such as text mining. It provides a web-based user interface that allows a convenient and sophisticated access to the data.

History

BRENDA was founded in 1987 at the former German Research Centre for Biotechnology (now the Helmholtz Centre for Infection Research) in Braunschweig and was originally published as a series of books. Its name was originally an acronym for the BRaunschweig ENzyme DAtabase. From 1996 to 2007, BRENDA was located at the University of Cologne. There, BRENDA developed into a publicly accessible enzyme information system. In 2007, BRENDA returned to Braunschweig. Currently, BRENDA is maintained and further developed at the BRICS ( Braunschweig Integrated Centre of Systems Biology) at the TU Braunschweig.

In 2018 BRENDA was appointed to ELIXIR Core Data Resource with fundamental importance to biological and biomedical research and long-term preservation of biological data.

Updates

A major update of the data in BRENDA is performed twice a year. Besides the upgrade of its content, improvements of the user interface are also incorporated into the BRENDA database.

Content and features 

Database:

The database contains more than 40 data fields with enzyme-specific information on more than 8300 EC numbers that are classified according to the IUBMB.
The different data fields cover information on the enzyme's nomenclature, reaction and specificity, enzyme structure, isolation and preparation, enzyme stability, kinetic parameters such as Km value and turnover number, occurrence and localization, mutants and engineered enzymes, application of enzymes and ligand-related data. Currently, BRENDA contains manually annotated data from over 165,000 different scientific articles. Each enzyme entry is clearly linked to at least one literature reference, to its source organism, and, where available, to the protein sequence of the enzyme. 

An in-house development of the BRENDA team is the BRENDA tissue ontology (BTO), a comprehensive, structured encyclopedia with controlled vocabulary for terms and names for tissues, organs, anatomical structures, plant parts, cell cultures, cell types, and cell lines in organisms from all taxonomic groups.

An important part of BRENDA represent the almost 260,000 enzyme ligands, which are available on their names, synonyms or via the chemical structure. The term "ligand" is used in this context to all low molecular weight compounds which interact with enzymes. These include not only metabolites of primary metabolism, co-substrates or cofactors but also enzyme inhibitors or metal ions. The origin of these molecules ranges from naturally occurring antibiotics to synthetic compounds that have been synthesized for the development of drugs or pesticides.
Furthermore, cross-references to external information resources such as sequence and 3D-structure databases, as well as biomedical ontologies, are provided.

Extensions:

Since 2006, the data in BRENDA is supplemented with information extracted from the scientific literature by a co-occurrence based text mining approach. For this purpose, four text-mining repositories FRENDA (Full Reference ENzyme DAta), AMENDA (Automatic Mining of ENzyme DAta), DRENDA (Disease-Related ENzyme information DAtabase) and KENDA (Kinetic ENzyme DAta) were introduced. These text-mining results were derived from the titles and abstracts of all articles in the literature database PubMed.

Data access:

There are several tools to obtain access to the data in BRENDA. Some of them are listed here.

 Several different query forms (e.g., quick and advanced search)
 EC tree browser
 Taxonomy tree browser
 Ontologies for different biological domains (e.g., BRENDA tissue ontology, Gene Ontology)
 Thesaurus for ligand names
 Chemical substructure search engine for ligand structures
 BRENDA Pathway Maps

Download options:
 SOAP-API
 SBML-download
 BRENDA download (textfile oder JSON-Format])

Availability 

The use of BRENDA is free of charge. BRENDA is subject to the terms of the Creative Commons license (CC BY 4.0).

Other databases 

BRENDA provides links to several other databases with a different focus on the enzyme, e.g., metabolic function or enzyme structure. Other links lead to ontological information on the corresponding gene of the enzyme in question. Links to the literature are established with PubMed.
BRENDA links to some further databases and repositories such as:

 BRENDA tissue ontology
 ExPASy
 NCBI databases (Protein, nucleotide, structure, genome, OMIM, Domains
 IUBMB enzyme nomenclature
 KEGG
 PDB database (3D information)
 PROSITE
 SCOP
 CATH
 InterPro
 ChEBI
 Uniprot

References

Further reading

External links 
 Official BRENDA website
 Enzyme Nomenclature
 Springer Handbook of Enzymes
 Worthington Enzyme Manual
 ExplorEnz The Enzyme Database

Enzyme databases